Frank Bucci is a retired American soccer goalkeeper who spent three seasons in the American Soccer League and two in the Major Indoor Soccer League

Bucci attended the University of Pittsburgh where he played on the men's soccer team from 1974 to 1977.  In 1978, he played for the Connecticut Yankees of the American Soccer League.  He moved to the Columbus Magic for the 1979 season.  He also played for the Pittsburgh Spirit of the Major Indoor Soccer League. He later played for the Denver Avalanche.  At some point in his career, he also played for Pittsburgh Beadling.

He has coached the Bishop Watterson High School boys' soccer team.

References

External links
 MISL stats

1956 births
Living people
Soccer players from Pittsburgh
American soccer players
American Soccer League (1933–1983) players
Columbus Magic players
Connecticut Wildcats soccer players
Denver Avalanche players
Major Indoor Soccer League (1978–1992) players
New York United players
Pittsburgh Beadling players
Pittsburgh Panthers men's soccer players
Pittsburgh Spirit players
Association football goalkeepers